Campodenno (Ciamdadén or Campodén in local dialect) is a comune (municipality) in Trentino in the northern Italian region Trentino-Alto Adige/Südtirol, located about  northwest of Trento.

It includes the following frazioni (neighborhoods): Dercolo (Dercol), Lover, Quetta (Chèta), and Termon.

Campodenno borders the following municipalities: Tuenno, Denno, Ton, Sporminore, and Spormaggiore.

Demographic evolution

References

Cities and towns in Trentino-Alto Adige/Südtirol